Port Severn/Oak Bay Water Aerodrome  is located adjacent to Port Severn, Ontario, Canada.

References

Transport in Simcoe County
Registered aerodromes in Ontario
Seaplane bases in Ontario